The men's discus throw at the 2012 African Championships in Athletics was held at the Stade Charles de Gaulle on June 29.

Medalists

Records

Schedule

Results

Final

References

Results

Discus throw Men
Discus throw at the African Championships in Athletics